Peter Michael Escovedo (born July 13, 1935 in Pittsburg, California) is an American percussionist.

With his two brothers, Pete formed Escovedo Bros Latin Jazz Sextet, before Carlos Santana hired Pete and Coke Escovedo for his group.
He led the 14–24 piece Latin big band Azteca. His daughter is singer-percussionist Sheila E. They were both presented with the Latin Grammy Lifetime Achievement Award in 2021.

Discography
 1977 Solo Two (Fantasy)
 1978 Happy Together (Fantasy)
 1982 Island (EsGo/Fantasy)
 1985 Yesterday's Memories Tomorrow's Dreams (Concord Crossover)
 1987 Mister E (Concord Crossover)
 1995 Flying South (Concord Picante)
 1997 E Street (Concord Jazz)
 2000 E Musica (Concord Jazz)
 2001 Whatcha Gonna Do (Concord Jazz)
 2003 Live
 2012 Live from Stern Grove Festival (Concord Jazz)
 2018  Back to the Bay (Esco)

See also
List of Austin City Limits performers

References

External links
 

American musicians of Mexican descent
American jazz drummers
American jazz percussionists
Hispanic and Latino American musicians
Jazz percussionists
Jazz musicians from California
Musicians from the San Francisco Bay Area
1935 births
Living people
Santana (band) members
Timbaleros
People from Pittsburg, California
20th-century American drummers
American male drummers
American male jazz musicians
Latin Grammy Lifetime Achievement Award winners
American performers of Latin music